Mauri Holappa (born 9 June 1965) is a Finnish football coach and former footballer. He played in Veikkausliiga for OTP Oulu and RoPS.

Playing career
Holappa has played for OPS Oulu, OTP Oulu, Haka Valkeakoski, Kiruna FF, Rovaniemi PS and IFK Luleå.

Coaching career
Holappa managed Veikkausliiga team RoPS in 2001. Holappa is managing Djurgården (women).

References

1965 births
Living people
People from Utajärvi
Finnish footballers
Finnish football managers
FC Haka players
Rovaniemen Palloseura players
IFK Luleå players
Rovaniemen Palloseura managers
Djurgårdens IF Fotboll (women) managers
Association football midfielders
Oulun Työväen Palloilijat players
Sportspeople from North Ostrobothnia
Elitettan managers